Anathallis bleyensis is a species of orchid plant native to Brazil.

References 

bleyensis
Flora of Brazil